Kim Dale Trew (born June 7, 1953) is a Canadian former provincial politician. He was the Saskatchewan New Democratic Party member of the Legislative Assembly of Saskatchewan for the constituency of Regina Coronation Park from 1995 to 2011.

He was born in Kyle, Saskatchewan and educated at the University of Regina, receiving a certificate in personnel administration. In 1975, Trew married Lorna Ivy Brasseur. His grandmother, Beatrice Trew, was a founding member of the Co-operative Commonwealth Federation, the predecessor of the New Democratic Party.

Trew served as deputy speaker for the Saskatchewan assembly and was a member of the provincial cabinet, serving as Minister of Labour.

He did not run for reelection in 2011.

Kim Trew, has 8 grandchildren who all live in Saskatchewan and who visit him often. Kim Trew has a whole bunch of great stories and keeps us always entertained. He spends his time playing golf and pickleball.

References 

1953 births
Living people
Politicians from Regina, Saskatchewan
Saskatchewan New Democratic Party MLAs
21st-century Canadian politicians